Fly International Luxurious Art is the sixth studio album by American rapper and Wu-Tang Clan member Raekwon. The album was released on April 28, 2015, by Ice H2O Records and Caroline Records. The album was supported by the singles "All About You", "Soundboy Kill It" and "Wall to Wall".

Background
On January 1, 2013, Raekwon announced that his next studio album would be titled "F.I.L.A.", an acronym for "Fly International Luxurious Art", and said it would be released in the second quarter of 2013. On February 15, 2013, Raekwon said the album was almost finished.

Raekwon said that the album is an ode to his "stylish" side and the album will contain elements of "glamour, lifestyle and fashion." He said he is attempting to appeal to a broader global audience and have this album become a "worldwide success". On July 22, 2013, he told MTV he was still working on the album, along with the upcoming Wu-Tang Clan album with the former due for a release near the end of the year.

Recording and production
The album's recording process began in late 2012. For the album, he collaborated with artists such as Estelle, Melanie Fiona and Akon. Production on the album was handled by producers such as Jerry Wonda, RoadsArt and Frank G. among others. In a late-February 2014 interview, Raekwon stated that Akon and Snoop Dogg would be featured on the album. He also confirmed that the album was close to being complete.

Release and promotion
Raekwon announced on November 30, 2012 that he would soon release an EP titled Lost Jewlry. The EP was released for free by his label Ice H2O on January 15, 2013. The EP featured guest appearances from Faith Evans, Freddie Gibbs, Altrina Renee and Maino, and includes production from Scram Jones, Buckwild and more.

On March 7, 2013, Raekwon announced that the album would be released in June 2013. On April 30, he announced that the album would be pushed back until September 2013. Then once the first single was released he confirmed a pushback until January 2014 during an interview in late August 2013 with ABC News.

Starting June 14 through June 30, 2013, Raekwon toured across Canada on the Canadian leg of his "Fly International Luxurious Art Tour". That legs opening act is the band Masters of Ceremonies. Following that, he toured the United States and Europe with the rest of the Wu-Tang Clan on their 20th Anniversary Tour. On June 20, 2014, he announced that the album would be released on September 16, 2014. However, on October 13, 2014, Raekwon confirmed via Twitter that the album was pushed back to 2015 in order to focus on the Wu-Tang Clan's latest album A Better Tomorrow.

Singles
The album's first single "All About You" featuring Estelle and produced by Jerry Wonda was released on August 20, 2013. The music video for "All About You" featuring Estelle had been shot in New York in June 2013. It was released two days after the song's retail release, via Fuse.

On June 6, 2013, "Soundboy Kill It" featuring Melanie Fiona was premiered. On December 10, 2013, "Soundboy Kill It" was released to iTunes as the album's second single. On March 17, 2015, the album's third single "Wall to Wall" featuring French Montana and Busta Rhymes was released.

Critical reception

Fly International Luxurious Art received positive reviews from music critics. At Metacritic, which assigns a normalized rating out of 100 to reviews from critics, the album received an average score of 63, which indicates "generally favorable reviews", based on 17 reviews. Michael Madden of Consequence of Sound said, "What F.I.L.A. lacks in overt emotional content is made up for with the pleasure Raekwon takes in listing off his lavish purchases and seemingly constant jet-setting. Still, he lets you know that his darker days aren’t that far behind him, and that those tribulations helped him become the uncompromising artist he is today." Homer Johnsen of HipHopDX said, "F.I.L.A. had two years of hype for what amounts to an album with little true cohesion. The finished product doesn’t quite match the overwhelming talent and legacy of the legendary emcee." Corbin Reiff of The A.V. Club said, "For all its unintended sonic drawbacks, Fly International Luxurious Art goes a long way to remind everyone of why Raekwon is one of the greatest to ever wield a microphone. His flow is masterful, his lines are sharp, and his verbiage is as dense and intricate as it’s ever been."

Jesse Cataldo of Slant Magazine said, "Fly International Luxurious Art maintains some level of general interest through a stacked guest list, with visitors as varied as Snoop Dogg, A$AP Rocky, Busta Rhymes, and 2 Chainz, but none of them do more than distract from the overall atmosphere of paltry unevenness." Justin Ivey of XXL said, "Fly International Luxurious Art ultimately suffers from its inability to connect with any particular audience. It makes for a very uneven listening experience as the album is unable to find any cohesive sound or theme."

Track listing

Notes
 signifies a co-producer producer.

Sample credits
 "Wall to Wall" contains a sample of "Let Me Be Your Angel" performed by Stacey Lattisaw.
 "1,2 1,2" contains a sample of "Ike's Mood I" performed by Isaac Hayes, and "Make the Music with Your Mouth, Biz" performed by Biz Markie.
 "Live to Die" contains a sample of "Pity For the Children" performed by Zulema.
 "Revory (Wraith)" contains a sample of "Where Can I Go" performed by Marlena Shaw.

Personnel

2 Chainz –	Featured Artist
Arden "Keyz" Altino –	Composer, Keyboards, Producer
A$AP Rocky –	Featured Artist
Assassin –	Featured Artist
Ashley Bannister –	Composer
Stacy Barthe –	Vocals
Alex Bartnett –	Assistant
BlueRocks –	Producer
Matthew Burnett –	Composer, Producer
Busta Rhymes – 	Featured Artist
Dragan "Chach" Cacinovic –	Mastering
Jeffrey Ethan Campbell –	Composer
Mel Carter –	A&R, Product Manager
Sheldon Clarke	– Assistant
Kasseem Dean	– Composer
Scoop DeVille	– Producer
Akene "the Champ" Dunkley –	Producer
Jerry "Wonda" Duplessis –	Composer, Executive Producer, Producer
DZL – 	Producer
Tauheed Epps –	Composer
Estelle –	Featured Artist
Melanie Fiona –	Featured Artist
Justin Forsley –	Guitar Engineer
Jamie Frank –	Composer
French Montana –	Featured Artist
Frank G –	Engineer, Producer
Ghostface Killah –	Featured Artist
Larry D. Griffin, Jr. –	Composer
Frank Guastella – 	Composer
Jessica Harley	– A&R
Koby Hass –	Assistant
Rene "Snaz" Hill –	Composer
Michael Holmes –	Composer
Garnik Hovannesian –	Assistant

Angela Hunte	– Composer, Vocals
Scram Jones –  	Engineer, Executive Producer, Producer, Vocals
Sham "Sak Pase" Joseph –	Composer, Producer
Kelly G. –	Vocals
Karim Kharbouch –	Composer
Christina Lessa –	Art Direction
Deborah Mannis-Gardner –	Sample Clearance
Robert Megeehan –	Assistant
Elijah Molina –	Composer
John Newsom –	Art Direction, Artwork
Kris Peterson –	A&R
Lance Powell – 	Assistant, Engineer, Vocals
Brittney Pressley –	Vocals
Raekwon –	Art Direction, Executive Producer, Primary Artist, Producer
Régine	– Vocals
Ralph Rhim –	Vocals
RoadsArt  –	Engineer, Mixing
Andrew Robert –	Assistant
William Roberts –	Composer
Andrew Robertson –	Assistant
Liz Rodrigues –	Composer, Featured Artist
Natalie Rosario –	Vocals
Rick Ross –	Featured Artist
S1 –	Producer
Marc Schemer –	Composer
She Da God –	Producer
Snaz –	Producer
Snoop Dogg –	Featured Artist
Edward Supo – 	Composer
Estelle Swaray –	Composer
Serge Tsai –	Engineer, Mixing
Eric Wiley –	Graphic Design Layout
Kevin "Kev-O" Wilson –	Assistant
Donperrion Woods –	A&R, Executive Producer

Charts

References

2015 albums
Raekwon albums
Albums produced by Jerry Duplessis
Albums produced by Scoop DeVille
Albums produced by Scram Jones
Albums produced by Symbolyc One
Albums produced by Swizz Beatz